Yevgeny Alekseyevich Bokaryov (– 11 March 1971) was a Soviet linguist known among other things for his work on the Northeast Caucasian languages and his interlinguistics works; he was a member of the Academy of Esperanto.

1904 births
1971 deaths
20th-century linguists

Communist Party of the Soviet Union members
Southern Federal University alumni
Recipients of the Order of the Red Banner of Labour
Recipients of the Order of the Red Star
Linguists from the Soviet Union
Russian Esperantists